The Division of Solomon is an Australian Electoral Division in the Northern Territory. It is largely coextensive with the Darwin/Palmerston metropolitan area. The only other division in the territory, the Division of Lingiari, covers the remainder of the territory.

Geography
Federal electoral division boundaries in Australia are determined at redistributions by a redistribution committee appointed by the Australian Electoral Commission. Redistributions occur for the boundaries of divisions in a particular state or territory, and they occur every seven years, or sooner if a state or territory's representation entitlement changes or when divisions of a state or territory are malapportioned.

History

The division was one of the two established when the former Division of Northern Territory was redistributed on 21 December 2000. 
It is named for Hon Vaiben Louis Solomon, a Premier of South Australia, a delegate to the second Constitutional convention and member of the first Australian Parliament. He had represented the Northern Territory in the South Australian House of Assembly, when it was still part of that colony.

The Division was first contested at the 2001 federal election. Although the Darwin/Palmerston area had historically been a stronghold for the Country Liberal Party at the territorial level, recent gains by Labor have made it much more competitive. It has taken on a character similar to mortgage belt seats. As such, for most of its history, it has been a marginal seat usually held by the party of government.

The CLP's Dave Tollner very narrowly won the seat in 2001, then increased his majority in 2004 before narrowly losing it to Labor's Damian Hale at the 2007 election, where Labor won a landslide victory. At the 2010 election, the CLP's Natasha Griggs won Solomon back with a two-party-preferred margin of 1.75 percent from a 1.94 percent swing. She therefore became the first opposition member in the seat's history. Griggs was re-elected with a reduced two-party margin of 1.4 percent at the 2013 election as the Coalition won government.

A MediaReach seat-level opinion poll in Solomon of 513 voters conducted 22−23 June during the 2016 election campaign unexpectedly found Labor heavily leading the Liberals 61–39 on the two-party vote from a large 12.4 percent swing.

Griggs and the CLP lost Solomon to Labor's Luke Gosling at the 2016 election held on 2 July, with Gosling becoming the first Labor candidate to win the primary vote and defeating Griggs on a 56–44 two-party vote from a record 7.4 percent swing—in both cases, the strongest result in the seat's history.  Gosling is the second opposition member to hold the seat. This was later seen as a forerunner to the CLP's disastrous performance at the NT general election held later that year, where the party won just 2 seats out of 25, including only one in the Darwin area. Gosling retained the seat in 2019 with a reduced majority, and regained some majority in 2022.

Members

Election results

References

External links
 Division of Solomon - Australian Electoral Commission

Electoral divisions of Australia
Constituencies established in 2000
2000 establishments in Australia